Gyula Teleki (born Gyula Tiegelmann, on 15 February 1928 in Arad – before 14 June 2017) was a Hungarian football player and coach.

Teleki was a talented full back who played three times for the Hungary national team in the mid-1950s, and ended his top flight playing career beating Real Madrid in the European Cup with his club side Vasas SC. He also played for Debreceni VSC.

Teleki coached Debreceni VSC, Al-Merreikh, Pécsi Dózsa SC, Diósgyőri VTK, Wisła Kraków, Iraq and Al-Sulaibikhat.

References

1928 births
2017 deaths
Sportspeople from Debrecen
Hungarian footballers
Association football defenders
Hungary international footballers
Debreceni VSC players
Vasas SC players
Hungarian football managers
Wisła Kraków managers
Debreceni VSC managers
Iraq national football team managers
Pécsi MFC managers
Hungarian expatriate football managers
Hungarian expatriate sportspeople in Poland
Expatriate football managers in Poland
Hungarian expatriate sportspeople in Iraq
Expatriate football managers in Iraq